

Events

January 

 January 1 – The European Economic Community (EEC) comes into being.
 January 3 – The West Indies Federation is formed.
 January 4 
 Edmund Hillary's Commonwealth Trans-Antarctic Expedition completes the third overland journey to the South Pole, the first to use powered vehicles.
 Sputnik 1 (launched on October 4, 1957) falls to Earth from its orbit, and burns up.
 January 13 – Battle of Edchera: The Moroccan Army of Liberation ambushes a Spanish patrol.
 January 27 – A Soviet-American executive agreement on cultural, educational and scientific exchanges, also known as the "Lacy–Zarubin Agreement", is signed in Washington, D.C.
 January 31 – The first successful American satellite, Explorer 1, is launched into orbit.

February 

 February 1 – Egypt and Syria unite, to form the United Arab Republic.
 February 6 – Seven Manchester United footballers are among the 21 people killed in the Munich air disaster in West Germany, on the return flight from a European Cup game in Yugoslavia. 23 people survive, but 4 of them, including manager Matt Busby and players Johnny Berry and Duncan Edwards, are in serious condition. Busby and Berry will pull through, although Berry will never play again.  Edwards dies a fortnight later.
 February 11
Marshal Chen Yi succeeds Zhou Enlai as Chinese Minister of Foreign Affairs.
 Ruth Carol Taylor is the first African American woman hired as a flight attendant. Hired by Mohawk Airlines, her career lasts only 6 months, due to another discriminatory barrier – the airline's ban on married flight attendants.
 February 14 – The Hashemite Kingdoms of Iraq and Jordan unite in the Arab Federation, with King Faisal II of Iraq as head of state.
 February 21 – A peace symbol is designed and completed by Gerald Holtom, commissioned by the Campaign for Nuclear Disarmament, in protest against the Atomic Weapons Research Establishment.
 February 23
 Cuban rebels kidnap five-time world driving champion Juan Manuel Fangio, releasing him 28 hours later.
 Arturo Frondizi is elected president of Argentina.
 February 24 – In Cuba, Fidel Castro's Radio Rebelde begins broadcasting from Sierra Maestra.
 February 17 – Bertrand Russell launches the Campaign for Nuclear Disarmament in the UK.
 February 28 – Prestonsburg bus disaster: One of the worst school bus accidents in U.S. history occurs when a school bus hits a truck and falls into a river, resulting in 27 deaths, 26 of them schoolchildren. Twenty-two others are rescued.

March 

 March 1 – Turkish passenger ship  capsizes and sinks in the Gulf of İzmit, Turkey; at least 300 die.
 March 2 – A British Commonwealth Trans-Antarctic Expedition team, led by Sir Vivian Fuchs, completes the first overland crossing of the Antarctic, using snowcat caterpillar tractors and dogsled teams, in 99 days, via the South Pole.
 March 8 – The  is decommissioned, leaving the United States Navy without an active battleship for the first time since 1896 (she is recommissioned October 22, 1988).
 March 11 – A U.S. B-47 bomber accidentally drops an atom bomb on Mars Bluff, South Carolina. Without a fissile warhead, its conventional explosives destroy a house and injure several people.
 March 17 – The United States launches the Vanguard 1 satellite.
 March 19 – The Monarch Underwear Company fire occurs in New York, United States, killing 24 people.
 March 25 – Canada's Avro Arrow makes its maiden flight.
 March 26
 The United States Army launches Explorer 3.
 The 30th Academy Awards Ceremony takes place; The Bridge on the River Kwai wins 7 awards, including Academy Award for Best Picture.
 March 27 – Nikita Khrushchev becomes Premier of the Soviet Union.

April 

 April 3 – In Cuba, Castro's revolutionary army begins its attacks on Havana.
 April 13 – The satellite Sputnik 2 (launched November 3, 1957) disintegrates during reentry from orbit.
 April 14 – Van Cliburn wins the International Tchaikovsky Competition for pianists in Moscow, breaking Cold War tensions.
 April 17 – King Baudouin of Belgium officially opens the world's fair in Brussels, also known as Expo 58. The Atomium forms the centrepiece.
 April 20 – The Montreal Canadiens win the Stanley Cup in ice hockey, after defeating the US team the Boston Bruins in 6 games.
 April 21 – United Airlines Flight 736 is involved in a mid-air collision with a U.S. Air Force F-100F jet fighter in what is now Enterprise, Nevada; all 49 persons in both aircraft are killed.

May 

 May 1
 Arturo Frondizi becomes President of Argentina.
 U.S. space scientist James van Allen announces the discovery of Earth's magnetosphere.
 The Nordic Passport Union comes into force.
 May 10 – Interviewed in the Chave d'Ouro café, when asked about his rival António de Oliveira Salazar, Humberto Delgado utters one of the most famous comments in Portuguese political history: "Obviamente, demito-o! (Obviously, I'll sack him!)".
 May 12 – A formal North American Aerospace Defense Command agreement is signed between the United States and Canada.
 May 13
 Crisis in France: French Algerian protesters seize government offices in Algiers, leading to a military coup.
 During a visit to Caracas, Venezuela, Vice President Richard Nixon's car is attacked by anti-American demonstrators.
 May 15 – The Soviet Union launches Sputnik 3.
 May 20 – The Cuban government of Fulgencio Batista launches a counteroffensive against Castro's rebels.
 May 22 – U.S. President Dwight D. Eisenhower becomes the first American elected official to be broadcast on color television. 
 May 23 – Explorer 1 ceases transmission.
 May 28 – Real Madrid beats A.C. Milan 3–2 at Heysel Stadium, Brussels and wins the 1957–58 European Cup.
 May 30 – The bodies of unidentified United States soldiers killed in action during World War II and the Korean War are buried at the Tomb of the Unknowns, in Arlington National Cemetery.

June 

 June 1
 Charles de Gaulle is brought out of retirement at Colombey-les-Deux-Églises to lead France by decree for 6 months.
 Iceland extends its fishing limits to 12 miles (22.2 km).
 June 4 – French Prime Minister Charles de Gaulle visits Algeria.
 June 16 – Imre Nagy and other leaders of the failed Hungarian Revolution of 1956 are hanged for treason, following secret trials.
 June 20 – The iron barque Omega of Callao, Peru (built in Liverpool, 1887), sinks on passage carrying guano from the Pachacamac Islands for Huacho, the world's last full-rigged ship trading under sail alone.
 June 27 – The Peronist Party becomes legal again in Argentina.
 June 29 – Brazil beats Sweden 5–2 in the final game, to win the football World Cup in Sweden.
 June 30 – The Ifni War ends in Spanish Sahara.

July 

 July 9 – 1958 Lituya Bay megatsunami: A 7.8  strike-slip earthquake in Southeast Alaska causes a landslide that produces a megatsunami. The runup from the waves reaches  on the rim of Lituya Bay.
 July 11 – Count Michael Rhédey von Kis-Rhéde, direct descendant of Samuel Aba, King of Hungary, age 60, is pistol-whipped and murdered over a few hectares of land by Czechoslovak Communists, during the collectivization process at his residence in Olcsvar, Slovakia.
 July 12 – Henri Cornelis becomes Governor-General of the Belgian Congo, the last Belgian governor prior to independence.
 July 14 – July 14 Revolution in Iraq: King Faisal is killed. Abd al-Karim Qasim assumes power.
 July 15 – In Lebanon, 5,000 United States Marines land in the capital Beirut in support of the pro-Western government.
 July 24 – Fourteen life peerages, the first under the Life Peerages Act 1958, are created in the United Kingdom.
 July 26
 Explorer program: Explorer 4 is launched in the United States.
 Queen Elizabeth II of the United Kingdom announces that she is giving her son and heir apparent Prince Charles, the customary title of Prince of Wales. The announcement is made at the end of the 1958 British Empire and Commonwealth Games, held in Cardiff.
 July 29 – The U.S. Congress formally creates the National Aeronautics and Space Administration (NASA).
 July 31 – The Tibetan resistance movement against rule by China receives support from the United States Central Intelligence Agency.

August 

 August 3 – The nuclear-powered submarine  becomes the first vessel to cross the North Pole under water.
 August 6 
 Australian athlete Herb Elliott clips almost 3 seconds off the world record for the mile run at Santry Stadium, Dublin, recording a time of 3 minutes 54.5 seconds.
 The Law of Permanent Defense of Democracy, which outlawed the Communist Party of Chile and banned 26,650 persons from the electoral lists, is repealed.
 August 14 – KLM Flight 607-E, a Lockheed L-1049 Super Constellation, crashes into the sea with 99 people aboard.
 August 17 – The first Thor-Able rocket is launched, carrying Pioneer 0, from Cape Canaveral Air Force Station Space Launch Complex 17. The launch fails due to a first stage malfunction.
 August 18 – Brojen Das from East Pakistan swims across the English Channel in a competition, the first Bangali as well as the first Asian to ever do it. He is first among 39 competitors.
 August 21 – October 15 – Illinois observes the centennial of the Lincoln–Douglas debates.
 August 23 – The Second Taiwan Strait Crisis begins, with the People's Liberation Army's bombardment of Quemoy.
 August 26 – A general strike is called in Paraguay.
 August 30 – September 1 – Notting Hill race riots: Riots occur between blacks and whites in Notting Hill, London.

September 

 September 1 – The first Cod War begins between the United Kingdom and Iceland.
 September 2
 Hendrik Verwoerd becomes the 6th Prime Minister of South Africa.
 China's first television broadcasts start at Beijing Television Station, a predecessor of China Central Television.　
 September 4 – Jorge Alessandri is the winner of Chile's presidential election.
 September 12 – Jack Kilby invents the first integrated circuit, while working at Texas Instruments.
 September 14 – Two rockets designed by German engineer Ernst Mohr (the first German post-war rockets) reach the upper atmosphere.
 September 18 – BankAmericard, the first credit card to be widely offered, is launched in Fresno, California in what becomes known as the "Fresno Drop".
 September 27
 Typhoon Ida kills at least 1,269 in Honshū, Japan.
 Hurricane Helene, the worst storm of the North Atlantic hurricane season, reaches category 4 status.
 September 28 – In the 1958 French constitutional referendum, a majority of 79% says yes to the constitution of the Fifth Republic.
 September 30 – The U.S.S.R. performs a nuclear test at Novaya Zemlya.

October 

 October – GoldStar, as predecessor for LG Electronics, founded in South Korea.
 October 1
 Tunisia and Morocco join the Arab League.
 NASA starts operations and replaces the NACA in the United States.
 October 2 – Guinea declares itself independent from France.
 October 4
 The new Constitution of France is signed into law, establishing the French Fifth Republic.
 British Overseas Airways Corporation uses the new De Havilland Comet jets, to become the first airline to fly jet passenger services across the Atlantic.
 October 11 – Pioneer 1, the second and most successful of the 3 project Able space probes, becomes the first spacecraft launched by the newly formed NASA.
 October 17 – An Evening with Fred Astaire, the first television show recorded on color videotape, is broadcast on NBC in the United States.
 October 18 – Tennis for Two, a game invented by William Higinbotham and considered to be the first pure entertainment computer game, is introduced at the Brookhaven National Laboratory Visitors' Day Exhibit in the United States. 
 October 26 –  A Pan American World Airways Boeing 707 makes its first transatlantic flight.
 October 28 – Pope John XXIII succeeds Pope Pius XII, as the 261st pope.

November 

 November 3
 The new UNESCO building, World Heritage Centre, is inaugurated in Paris.
 Jorge Alessandri  is sworn in as President of Chile.
 November 10 – The bossa nova is born in Rio de Janeiro, with João Gilberto's recording of Chega de Saudade.
 November 10 – Harry Winston donates the Hope Diamond to the Smithsonian Institution.
 November 18 – En route to Rogers City, Michigan, the Lake freighter  breaks up and sinks in a storm on Lake Michigan; 33 of the 35 crewmen on board perish.
 November 20 – The Jim Henson Company is founded as Muppets, Inc. in the United States.
 November 22 – 1958 Australian federal election: Robert Menzies' Liberal/Country Coalition Government is re-elected with a slightly increased majority, defeating the Labor Party led by H.V. Evatt. This is the first election where television was used as a medium for communicating with voters. Evatt will eventually resign as Labor leader and will be replaced by his deputy Arthur Calwell.
 November 25 – French Sudan gains autonomy as a self-governing member of the French colonial empire.
 November 28 – Chad, the Republic of the Congo, and Gabon become autonomous republics within the French colonial empire.
 November 30 – Gaullists win the French parliamentary election.

December 

 December 1
 Our Lady of the Angels School fire: 90 students and 3 nuns are killed in a fire in Chicago.
 Adolfo López Mateos takes office as President of Mexico.
 December 14 – The 3rd Soviet Antarctic Expedition becomes the first ever to reach the Southern Pole of Inaccessibility.
 December 15 – Arthur L. Schawlow and Charles H. Townes of Bell Laboratories publish a paper in Physical Review Letters setting out the principles of the optical laser.
 December 16
 A fire breaks out in the Vida Department Store in Bogotá, Colombia and kills 84 persons.
 Soviet polar pilot V. M. Perov on Li-2 rescues four Belgian polar explorers, led by Gaston de Gerlache, who have survived a plane crash in Antarctica 250 km from their base five days earlier.
 December 18
 The United States launches SCORE, the world's first communications satellite.
 The Bell XV-3 Tiltrotor makes the first true mid-air transition from vertical helicopter-type flight to fully level fixed-wing flight.
 December 19 – A message from U.S. President Dwight D. Eisenhower is broadcast from the SCORE satellite.
 December 21 – General Charles de Gaulle is elected president of France with 78.5% of the votes.
 December 24 – 1958 BOAC Bristol Britannia crash: A BOAC Bristol Britannia (312 G-AOVD) crashes near Winkton, England, during a test flight, killing nine people. Three crew members survive.
 December 28 – In American football, the Baltimore Colts beat the New York Giants 23–17 to win the NFL Championship Game, the first to go into sudden death overtime and "The Greatest Game Ever Played".
 December 29 – Battle of Santa Clara: Rebel troops under Camilo Cienfuegos and Che Guevara begin to invade Santa Clara, Cuba.
 December 30 – The Guatemalan Air Force fires on Mexican fishing boats which had strayed into Guatemalan territory, triggering the Mexico–Guatemala conflict.
 December 31 – After the fall of Santa Clara, Cuban President Fulgencio Batista flees the country.

Date unknown 
 Denatonium, the bitterest substance known, is discovered. It is used as an aversive agent in products such as bleach to reduce the risk of children drinking them.

Births

January 

 January 1 – Grandmaster Flash, Barbadian-American hip-hop/rap DJ
 January 4 – Matt Frewer, Canadian-American actor (Max Headroom)
 January 6 – Shlomo Glickstein, Israeli tennis player
 January 7 – Yasmin Ahmad, Malaysian film director, writer and scriptwriter (d. 2009)
 January 8 – Betsy DeVos, American businesswoman and politician, 11th Secretary of Education
 January 9 – Mehmet Ali Ağca, Turkish militant, would-be assassin of Pope John Paul II
 January 10 – Samira Said, Moroccan singer
 January 12 – Christiane Amanpour, British-born Iranian journalist and television host for CNN and PBS
 January 15 – Boris Tadić, Serbian president
 January 20 – Lorenzo Lamas, American actor, martial artist and reality show participant
 January 21 – Hussein Saeed, Iraqi football player
 January 24 – Jools Holland, British musician
 January 26
 Anita Baker, American soul and R&B singer
 Ellen DeGeneres, American actress, comedian, and television host
 January 28 – Maitê Proença, Brazilian actress

February 

 
 February 8 – Marina Silva, Brazilian politician
 February 9 – Cyrille Regis, English footballer (d. 2018)
 February 10 – Ricardo Gareca, Argentine footballer and manager
 February 13 – Pernilla August, Swedish actress
 February 15 – Shaun Toub, Iranian born-American actor
 February 16
 Ice-T, American rapper, songwriter, and actor
 Andriy Bal, Ukrainian football player and coach (d. 2014)
 February 21
 Jack Coleman, American actor and screenwriter
 Mary Chapin Carpenter, American singer
 February 26 – Susan Helms, American astronaut
 February 27 – Maggie Hassan, U.S. Senator from New Hampshire
 February 28 – Natalya Estemirova, Russian activist (d. 2009)

March 

 March 3 – Miranda Richardson, English actress
 March 4 – Patricia Heaton, American actress
 March 5 – Andy Gibb, English singer, songwriter, performer, and teen idol (d. 1988)
 March 7 – Rik Mayall, English comedian and actor (d. 2014)
 March 8 – Gary Numan, British singer
 March 10
 Sharon Stone, American actress and producer
 Frankie Ruiz, Puerto Rican singer (d. 1998)
 March 14 – Albert II, Prince of Monaco
 March 20 – Holly Hunter, American actress
 March 21 – Gary Oldman, English actor and filmmaker
 March 24 – Roland Koch, German politician
 March 26
 Elio de Angelis, Italian racing driver (d. 1986)
 Hala Fouad, Egyptian actress (died 1993)
 March 28
 Bart Conner, American gymnast
 Curt Hennig, American professional wrestler (d. 2003)
 March 30 – Maurice LaMarche, Canadian voice actor and comedian
 March 31 – Dietmar Bartsch, German politician

April 

 April 3 – Alec Baldwin, American actor 
 April 4 
 Cazuza, Brazilian poet, singer and composer (d. 1990)
 Vichai Srivaddhanaprabha, Thai billionaire businessman (d. 2018)
 April 12 – Ginka Zagorcheva, Bulgarian athlete
 April 14 – Peter Capaldi, Scottish actor
 April 15 – Benjamin Zephaniah, British writer and musician
 April 21
 Andie MacDowell, American actress
 Yoshito Usui, Japanese manga artist (Crayon Shin-chan) (d. 2009)
 April 24 – Susan Tsvangirai, Spouse of the Prime Minister of Zimbabwe (d. 2009)
 April 25 – Luis Guillermo Solís, President of Costa Rica
 April 26 – Giancarlo Esposito, Italian-American actor
 April 29
 Sergey Goryunov, Russian football coach and former Soviet player
 Michelle Pfeiffer, American actress

May 

 May 4 – Keith Haring, American artist (d. 1990)
 May 10
 Rick Santorum, American politician
 Ellen Ochoa, American astronaut, first Hispanic woman to go into space 
 May 12 – Dries van Noten, Belgian designer
 May 20 – Jane Wiedlin, American musician and actress
 May 23 – Drew Carey, American comedian and actor
 May 25 – Paul Weller, English singer-songwriter
 May 26 – Margaret Colin, American actress
 May 27 – Neil Finn, New Zealand singer and songwriter
 May 29
 Annette Bening, American actress
 Juliano Mer-Khamis, Israeli actor, director, filmmaker and political activist (d. 2011)
 May 30 – Marie Fredriksson, Swedish rock guitarist and singer-songwriter (d. 2019)

June 

 June 1 – Nambaryn Enkhbayar, Mongolian lawyer and politician, 3rd President of Mongolia 
 June 2 – Lex Luger, American professional wrestler
 June 3 – Margot Käßmann, Lutheran theologian, German bishop
 June 5 – Ahmed Abdallah Mohamed Sambi, Comoroan businessman and politician, President of Comoros 2006-2011
 June 7 – Prince, African-American musician (d. 2016)
 June 14 – Eric Heiden, American speed skater with five Olympic gold medals
 June 15 – Wade Boggs, American baseball player
 June 18 – Peter Altmaier, German jurist and politician, Federal Minister for Special Affairs of Germany	
 June 19 – Sergei Makarov, Russian ice-hockey player and coach 
 June 22
 Rocío Banquells, Mexican pop singer and actress
 Bruce Campbell, American actor, producer, writer and director
 June 24 – Tommy Lister Jr., American actor and professional wrestler (d. 2020)
 June 25 – Serik Akhmetov, 8th Prime Minister of Kazakhstan
 June 27 – Magnus Lindberg, Finnish composer
 June 29 – Rosa Mota, Portuguese long-distance runner
 June 30 
 Esa-Pekka Salonen, Finnish conductor and composer
 Irina Vorobieva, Russian pair skater 
 Vasil Yakusha, Belarusian rower

July 

 July 1 – Tom Magee, Canadian world champion powerlifter and strongman competitor
 July 2 – Pavan Malhotra, Indian actor
 July 5 – Bill Watterson, American cartoonist (Calvin and Hobbes)
 July 6 – Jennifer Saunders, British comedian and actress
 July 7 – Michala Petri, Danish recorder player
 July 8
 Kevin Bacon, American actor
 Neetu Singh, Indian actress
 July 10 – Fiona Shaw, Irish actress
 July 11 – Hugo Sánchez, Mexcian footballer player and coach
 July 12 – Valery Kipelov, Russian music artist and composer
 July 13 – Arun Pandian, Indian film actor, director, producer and politician
 July 14 – Jujie Luan, Chinese-Canadian fencer
 July 15 – Jörg Kachelmann, Swiss presenter, journalist and entrepreneur in the meteorological field
 July 16 – Michael Flatley, Irish-born dancer
 July 17 – Wong Kar-wai, Hong Kong second wave filmmaker
 July 19 – Azumah Nelson, Ghanaian boxer
 July 20 – Billy Mays, American salesperson (d. 2009)
 July 22 – Tatsunori Hara, Japanese professional-baseball coach and player
 July 27 – Christopher Dean, British ice dancer and Olympian 
 July 28 – Terry Fox, Canadian athlete and cancer activist (d. 1981)
 July 30 – Kate Bush, English singer-songwriter
 July 31 – Mark Cuban, American entrepreneur and basketball team owner

August 

 August 1 – María Ignacia Benítez, Chilean politician (d. 2019)
 August 3 – Lambert Wilson, French actor
 August 5 – Andriy Fedetskyi, Ukrainian football player (d. 2018)
 August 7
 Bruce Dickinson, English musician (Iron Maiden)
 Russell Baze, Canadian/American champion jockey
 August 10 – Rami Hamdallah, Palestine politician
 August 16
 Angela Bassett, African-American actress
 Madonna, American-born singer, songwriter, and actress
 August 17 – Belinda Carlisle, American singer
 August 18
 Reg E. Cathey, African-American actor (d. 2018)
 Madeleine Stowe, American actress
 August 19 – Brendan Nelson, Australian politician
 August 22 – Colm Feore, American-born Canadian actor
 August 24 – Steve Guttenberg, American actor
 August 25 – Tim Burton, American film director
 August 27 – Kathy Hochul, American politician, Governor of New York
 August 29
 Michael Jackson, African-American singer, songwriter and dancer (d. 2009)
 Lenny Henry, English comedian and actor

September 

 September 2 – Zdravko Krivokapić, Montenegrin politician, Prime Minister of Montenegro
 September 6 – Jeff Foxworthy, American comedian, actor and author
 September 10
 Chris Columbus, American film director/writer/producer
 Siobhan Fahey, Irish singer (Bananarama, Shakespears Sister)
 September 13 – Paweł Przytocki, Polish conductor
 September 16 – Jennifer Tilly, Canadian/American actress
 September 17 – Janez Janša, 2-Time Prime Minister of Slovenia
 September 18 – Rachid Taha, Algerian singer and activist (d. 2018)
 September 19 – Lita Ford, British musician
 September 22
 Andrea Bocelli, Italian tenor
 Joan Jett, American rock musician
 September 24 – Kevin Sorbo, American actor
 September 27
 Shaun Cassidy, American actor, producer and screenwriter
 Irvine Welsh, Scottish writer
 September 29 – Eduardo Cunha, Brazilian politician, former President of the Chamber of Deputies of Brazil

October 

 October 3 – Chen Yanyin, Chinese sculptor
 October 5 – Neil deGrasse Tyson, American astrophysicist and science communicator
 October 8 – Ursula von der Leyen, German politician, President of the European Commission
 October 10 – Tanya Tucker, American singer
 October 13 – Jamal Khashoggi, Saudi journalist (d. 2018)
 October 16
 Noel Cleal, Australian rugby league player
 Tim Robbins, American actor and film director
 October 17 – Alan Jackson, American country singer and songwriter
 October 20
 Mark King, English pop-rock guitarist and singer (Level 42)
 Viggo Mortensen, Danish-American actor
 October 25 – Kornelia Ender, German swimmer
 October 26 – Pascale Ogier, French actress (d. 1984)
 October 27 – Simon Le Bon, English rock singer
 October 28 – Raúl Pellegrin, Chilean revolutionary, leader of Manuel Rodríguez Patriotic Front (died 1988)
 October 29 
 Blažej Baláž, Slovak painter
 Stefan Dennis, Australian actor & singer
 October 31 – Jeannie Longo, French cyclist

November 

 November 5 – Robert Patrick, American actor
 November 7 – Dmitry Kozak, Russian politician and deputy Prime Minister of Russia
 November 10 – Vicky Rosti, Finnish singer, former Eurovision contestant
 November 12
 Megan Mullally, American actress, singer and media personality
 Hiromi Iwasaki, Japanese singer
 November 14 – Sergio Goyri, Mexican actor
 November 16
 Sooronbay Jeenbekov, President of Kyrgyzstan
 Marg Helgenberger, American actress
 Boris Krivokapić, Serbian academic
 November 17 – Mary Elizabeth Mastrantonio, American actress and singer
 November 18 
 Laura Miller, American politician
 Oscar Nunez, Cuban-American actor and comedian
 November 18 – Daniel Brailovsky, Argentine-born Israeli footballer and manager
 November 22
 Jamie Lee Curtis, American actress
 Ibrahim Ismail of Johor, Sultan of Johor
 November 25 – Alice Cohen, American singer and fine artist
 November 27 – Tetsuya Komuro, Japanese music producer and songwriter
 November 28 – Tanya Harford, South African tennis player
 November 30 – Juliette Bergmann, Dutch bodybuilder

December 

 December 1
 Charlene Tilton, American actress
 Javier Aguirre, Mexican football player and manager
 December 2 – Mina Asami, Japanese actress
 December 6 – Nick Park, English filmmaker and animator
 December 10
 Cornelia Funke, German author
 Annelore Zinke, East German gymnast
 December 11 – Nikki Sixx, American rock musician
 December 12
 Monica Attard, Australian journalist
 Lucie Guay, Canadian canoer
 Dag Ingebrigtsen, Norwegian musician
 Sheree J. Wilson, American actress
 December 14 – François Zocchetto, French politician
 December 15 – Alfredo Ormando, Italian writer (d. 1998)
 December 16 – Katie Leigh, American voice actress
 December 18 – Julia Wolfe, American composer
 December 25
 Dimi Mint Abba, Mauritanian musician and singer (d. 2011)
 Rickey Henderson, African-American baseball player
 Alannah Myles, Canadian singer-songwriter
 December 26 – Mieko Harada, Japanese actress
 December 29 – Lakhdar Belloumi, Algerian football player
 December 31 – Bebe Neuwirth, American actress

Deaths

January 

 January 1 – Edward Weston, American photographer (b. 1886)
 January 3 – Cafer Tayyar Eğilmez, Turkish general (b. 1877)
 January 4 – Archie Alexander, American designer and governor (b. 1888)
 January 7 
 Margaret Anglin, Canadian stage actress (b. 1876)
 Petru Groza, Romanian politician, 46th Prime Minister of Romania and head of the State (born 1884)
 January 8 
 Mary Colter, American architect (b. 1869)
 Paul Pilgrim, American athlete (b. 1883)
 January 9 – Karl Reinhardt, German philologist. (born 1886)
 January 13 
 Jesse L. Lasky, American film producer (b. 1880)
 Edna Purviance, American actress (b. 1895)
 January 16 – Aubrey Mather, English actor (b. 1885)
 January 19 – Cândido Rondon, Brazilian military officer (b. 1865)
 January 20 – Ataúlfo Argenta, Spanish conductor and pianist (b. 1913)
 January 27 – Prince Oskar of Prussia (b. 1888)
 January 30 
 Jean Crotti, Swiss artist (b. 1878)
 Ernst Heinkel, German aircraft designer and manufacturer (b. 1888)

February 

 February 1 – Clinton Davisson, American physicist, Nobel Prize laureate (b. 1881)
 February 6 – Manchester United footballers killed in Munich air disaster
 Geoff Bent (b. 1932)
 Roger Byrne (b. 1929)
 Eddie Colman (b. 1936)
 Mark Jones (b. 1933)
 David Pegg (b. 1935) 
 Frank Swift (b. 1913)
 Tommy Taylor (b. 1932)
 Liam "Billy" Whelan (b. 1935)
 February 7 – Walter Kingsford, English actor (b. 1882)
 February 10 – Aleksander Klumberg, Estonian decathlete (b. 1899)
 February 11 – Ernest Jones, Welsh neurologist and psychoanalyst (b. 1879)
 February 13
 Christabel Pankhurst, English suffragette (b. 1880)
 Georges Rouault, French painter (b. 1871)
 Helen Twelvetrees, American actress (b. 1908)
 February 14 – Prince Heinrich of Bavaria (b. 1922)
 February 16 – Situ Qiao, Chinese painter (b. 1902)
 February 17 – Marguerite Snow, American actress (b. 1889)
 February 20 – Thurston Hall, American actor (b. 1882)
 February 21
 Henryk Arctowski, Polish scientist and explorer (b. 1871)
 Duncan Edwards English footballer, died from injuries sustained in the Munich air disaster (b. 1936)
 February 27 – Harry Cohn, American film producer (b. 1891)

March 

 March 1 – Giacomo Balla, Italian painter (b. 1871)
 March 6 – Anton Reinthaller, Austrian right wing politician (b. 1895)
 March 8 – Brian Swift, Australian cricketer, car accident (b. 1937)
 March 11 – Ole Kirk Christiansen, Danish businessman (born 1891)
 March 12 – Princess Ingeborg of Denmark (b. 1878)
 March 17 – Bertha De Vriese, Belgian physician (b. 1877)
 March 21 – Cyril M. Kornbluth, American writer (b. 1923)
 March 22 (in plane crash)
 Mike Todd, American film producer (b. 1909)
 Art Cohn, American screenwriter (b. 1909)
 March 23 
 Charlotte Walker, American actress (b, 1876)
 Florian Znaniecki, Polish philosopher and sociologist (b, 1882)
 March 24
 Herbert Fields, American librettist and screenwriter (b. 1897)
 Alexandros Hatzikyriakos, Greek admiral and politician (b. 1874)
 March 25 
Adegoke Adelabu, Nigerian politician (b. 1915)
 Tom Brown, American musician (b. 1888)
 March 26 – Phil Mead, English cricketer (b. 1887)
 March 28
 W. C. Handy, African-American blues composer (b. 1873)
 Chuck Klein, American baseball player (Philadelphia Phillies) and a member of the MLB Hall of Fame (b. 1904)

April 

 April 2 
 Willie Maley, Scottish football player and manager (b. 1868)
 Jōsei Toda, Japanese educator and activist (b. 1900)
 April 4 – María Luisa Sepúlveda, Chilean composer (b. 1898)
 April 5 – Prince Ferdinand of Bavaria (born 1884)
 April 8 
 Alcibíades Arosemena, Panamanian politician, 15th President of Panama (b. 1883)
 George Jean Nathan, American drama critic (b. 1882)
 Frank Eaton, American Deputy Marshal (b. 1860)
 Frank Kingdon-Ward, English botanist and explorer (b. 1885)
 April 15 – Estelle Taylor, American actress (b. 1894)
 April 16 – Rosalind Franklin, English crystallographer (b. 1920)
 April 17 – Rita Montaner, Cuban singer, pianist and actress (b. 1900)
 April 18 – Maurice Gamelin, French general (b. 1872)
 April 19 – Billy Meredith, Welsh footballer (b. 1874)

May 

 May 2 – Henry Cornelius, South African-born director (b. 1913)
 May 3 – Frank Foster, English cricketer (b. 1889)
 May 5 – James Branch Cabell, American writer (b. 1879)
 May 7 
 Joan Comorera, Spanish politician (b. 1894)
 Mihkel Lüdig, Estonian composer, organist and choir conductor (b. 1880)
 May 9 – Koshirō Oikawa, Japanese admiral (b. 1883)
 May 18 – Jacob Fichman, Israeli poet and essayist (b. 1881)
 May 19 
 Ronald Colman, English actor (b. 1891)
 Marie Pujmanová, Czechoslovak poet and novelist (b. 1893)
 Jadunath Sarkar, Indian historian (b. 1870)
 May 20 – Frédéric François-Marsal, 59th Prime Minister of France (b. 1874)
 May 22 – Sir Richmond Palmer, British lawyer and colonial administrator (b. 1877)
 May 26 – Constantin Cantacuzino, Romanian aviator (b. 1905)
 May 29 – Juan Ramón Jiménez, Spanish writer, Nobel Prize laureate (b. 1881)

June 

 June 2
 Townsend Cromwell, American oceanographer (plane crash) (b. 1922)
 Bell M. Shimada, American fisheries scientist (plane crash) (b. 1922)
 June 6
 Lloyd Hughes, American actor (b. 1897)
 Virginia Pearson, American actress (b. 1886)
 June 8 – Nicola da Gesturi, Italian Roman Catholic priest and blessed (b. 1882)
 June 9 – Robert Donat, English actor (b. 1905)
 June 13 – Edwin Keppel Bennett, British writer (b. 1887)
 June 16
 Imre Nagy, Hungarian politician, 44th Prime Minister of Hungary (executed) (b. 1896)
 Nereu Ramos, Brazilian politician, 20th President of Brazil (b. 1888)
 June 20 – Kurt Alder, German chemist, Nobel Prize laureate (b. 1902)
 June 21
 Herbert Brenon, American film director (b. 1880)
 Robert L. Ghormley, American admiral (b. 1883)
 June 24 – George Orton, Canadian athlete (b. 1876)
 June 25 – Alfred Noyes, English poet (b. 1880)
 June 27 – Vytautas Augustauskas, Soviet educator (b. 1904)

July 

 July 2 – Martha Boswell, American singer (b. 1905)
 July 3 – Charles Bathurst, 1st Viscount Bledisloe, English politician, 4th Governor-General of New Zealand (b. 1867)
 July 5 – Patriarch Vikentije II (b. 1890)
 July 9 – James H. Flatley, American naval aviator and admiral (b. 1906)
 July 14 (killed during coup d'état):
 King Faisal II of Iraq (b. 1935; assassinated)
 'Abd al-Ilah, Prince of Iraq (b. 1913; assassinated)
 Ibrahim Hashem, Jordanian lawyer and politician, 3-time Prime Minister of Jordan (b.  1888)
 July 15 – Nuri al-Said, Iraqi politician, 7th Prime Minister of Iraq (b. 1888)
 July 18 – Henri Farman, French aviator and aircraft company founder (b. 1874)
 July 20 – Franklin Pangborn, American actor (b. 1889)
 July 24 – Mabel Ballin, American actress (b. 1887)
 July 25 – Harry Warner, American studio executive (b. 1881)
 July 26 – Iven Carl Kincheloe Jr., American Korean War fighter ace and test pilot (b. 1928)
 July 27 – Claire Lee Chennault, American aviator and general, leader of the Flying Tigers (b. 1893)

August 

 August 1 – Albert E. Smith, English-born American stage magician, film director and producer (b. 1875)
 August 2 – Michele Navarra, Italian Sicilian Mafia boss (b. 1905)
 August 3 – Peter Collins, British Formula 1 driver (b. 1931)
 August 4 – Mario Zanin, Italian Roman Catholic prelate and monsignor (b. 1890)
 August 8 – Barbara Bennett, American actress (b. 1906)
 August 9 – Felipe Boero, Argentine composer (b. 1884)
 August 12 –  Augustus Owsley Stanley, American politician, Governor of Kentucky (b. 1867)
 August 14 – Frédéric Joliot-Curie, French physicist, recipient of the Nobel Prize in Chemistry (b. 1900)
 August 16 
 José Domingues dos Santos, Portuguese politician, 89th Prime Minister of Portugal (b. 1885)
 Paul Panzer, German actor (b. 1872)
 August 18 – Bonar Colleano, American actor (b. 1924)
 August 21 
 Stevan Hristić, Yugoslav composer (b. 1885)
 Kurt Neumann, German film director (b. 1908)
 August 22 – Roger Martin du Gard, French writer, Nobel Prize laureate (b. 1881)
 August 24
 Paul Henry, Northern Irish artist (b. 1876)
 J. G. Strijdom, 5th Prime Minister of South Africa (b. 1893)
 August 26 – Ralph Vaughan Williams, English composer (b. 1872)
 August 27 – Ernest Lawrence, American physicist, Nobel Prize laureate (b. 1901)
 August 29 – Marjorie Flack, American artist, illustrator and writer (b. 1897)

September 

 September 3 – Sir Giffard Le Quesne Martel, British army general (b. 1889)
 September 11
 Hans Grundig, German artist (b. 1901)
 Robert W. Service, Scottish-born Canadian poet (b. 1874)
 September 16 – Alma Bennett, American actress (b. 1904)
 September 23
 Alfred Piccaver, British-born American operatic tenor (b. 1884)
 Walter Friedrich Otto, German classical philologist (b. 1874)
 September 25 – John B. Watson, American psychologist (b. 1878)
 September 27 – Adolfo Salazar, Spanish historian, composer and diplomat (b. 1890)
 September 30 – Estate Tatanashvili, Soviet general (b. 1902)

October 

 October 9 – Pope Pius XII (b. 1876)
 October 11 – Maurice de Vlaminck, French painter (b. 1876)
 October 14 – Sir Douglas Mawson, Australian geologist and polar explorer (b. 1882)
 October 15 – Jack Norton, American actor (b. 1882)
 October 16 – Michalis Souyioul, Greek composer (b. 1906)
 October 17
 Celso Benigno Luigi Costantini, Italian Roman Catholic cardinal and eminence (b. 1876)
 Charlie Townsend, English cricketer (b. 1876)
 Paul Outerbridge, American photographer (b. 1896)
 October 24 – G. E. Moore, British philosopher of (Principia Ethica) (b. 1873)
 October 26 – Herbert A. Bartholomew, American farmer and politician (b. 1871)
 October 29 – Zoë Akins, American playwright, poet and author (b. 1886)

November 

 November 4 – Sam Zimbalist, American film producer (b. 1904)
 November 8 – C. Ganesha Iyer, Ceylon Tamil philologist (b. 1878)
 November 11 – André Bazin, French film critic and theorist (b. 1918)
 November 15 – Tyrone Power, American actor (b. 1914)
 November 16 – Samuel Hopkins Adams, American writer (b. 1871) 
 November 19 – Vittorio Ambrosio, Italian general (b. 1879)
 November 24
 Robert Cecil, 1st Viscount Cecil of Chelwood, English politician and diplomat, recipient of the Nobel Peace Prize (b. 1864)
 November 27 
 Artur Rodziński, Polish conductor (b. 1892)
 Georgi Damyanov, Bulgarian Communist political, Chairman of the Presidium of the National Assembly and head of the State (b. 1892)
 November 30 – Oscar C. Badger II, American admiral (b. 1890)

December 

 December 1 – Boots Mallory, American actress (born 1913)
 December 4 – José María Caro Rodríguez, Chilean Roman Catholic cardinal and eminence (born 1866)
 December 5 
 Willie Applegarth, British Olympic athlete (b. 1890)
 Patras Bokhari, Pakistani humorist (b. 1898)
 December 8 – Tris Speaker, American baseball player (Cleveland Indians) and a member of the MLB Hall of Fame (b. 1888)
 December 11 – Alberto Meschi, Italian anarchist (b. 1879)
 December 12 
 Slobodan Jovanović, Serbian intellectual and politician (b. 1869)
 Milutin Milanković, Yugoslav mathematician, astronomer, climatologist and geophysicist, (b. 1879)
 Albert Walsh, Lieutenant Governor of Newfoundland (b. 1900)
 December 13 – Tim Moore, American comedian (b. 1887)
 December 15 – Wolfgang Pauli, Austrian-born American physicist, Nobel Prize laureate (b. 1900)
 December 21 
 Lion Feuchtwanger, German novelist and playwright (b. 1884)
 H. B. Warner, English actor (b. 1876)
 December 27 – Mustafa Merlika-Kruja, 16th Prime Minister of Albania (b. 1887)
 December 29 – Doris Humphrey, American dancer and choreographer (b. 1895)

Nobel Prizes 

 Physics – Pavel Alekseyevich Cherenkov, Ilya Mikhailovich Frank, and Igor Yevgenyevich Tamm
 Chemistry – Frederick Sanger
 Physiology or Medicine – George Wells Beadle, Edward Lawrie Tatum, and Joshua Lederberg
 Literature – Boris Leonidovich Pasternak
 Peace – Georges Pire

References